César Chávez Street may be:

Cesar Chavez Street in San Francisco
Cesar Chavez Street (Austin) in Austin, Texas